The 186th Pennsylvania House of Representatives District is located in Southeast Pennsylvania and has been represented since 2013 by Jordan A. Harris.

District profile
The 186th Pennsylvania House of Representatives District is located in Philadelphia County and encompasses the Aquinas Center and the African Cultural Alliance of North America. It also includes the following areas:

 Ward 30
 Ward 36 [PART, Divisions 01, 02, 03, 04, 05, 06, 07, 08, 09, 14, 16, 17, 18, 19, 20, 21, 22, 23, 24, 25, 26, 27, 28, 29, 30, 31, 32, 33, 34, 35, 36, 37, 38, 39, 40 and 41]
 Ward 48 [PART, Divisions 04, 05, 06, 07, 08, 09, 10, 11, 12, 15, 16, 17, 18, 19, 21, 22 and 23]
 Ward 51 [PART, Divisions 03, 07, 08, 09, 10, 11, 12, 21, 22 and 24]

Representatives

Recent election results

References

External links
District map from the United States Census Bureau
Pennsylvania House Legislative District Maps from the Pennsylvania Redistricting Commission.  
Population Data for District 186 from the Pennsylvania Redistricting Commission.

Government of Philadelphia
186